Carex oligostachya is a tussock-forming species of perennial sedge in the family Cyperaceae. It is native to parts of Asia and Malesia from Assam in the west to the Solomon Islands in the east.

It was described by the botanist Christian Gottfried Daniel Nees von Esenbeck in 1854 as published in Hooker's journal of botany and Kew Garden miscellany.

See also
List of Carex species

References

oligostachya
Plants described in 1854
Taxa named by Christian Gottfried Daniel Nees von Esenbeck
Flora of Assam (region)
Flora of Myanmar
Flora of New Guinea
Flora of the Philippines
Flora of China
Flora of Sulawesi
Flora of Sumatra
Flora of Vietnam